White Man may refer to:

 White Man (film), a 1924 film by Louis J. Gasnier
 A ring name for professional wrestler Alberto Muñoz in the 1970s
 A song from the 1976 album A Day at the Races by Queen

See also
 White people
 
 
 Whiteman (disambiguation)